The 2019–20 season was FC Ararat Yerevan's 29th consecutive season in Armenian Premier League.

Season events
On 29 July, Sergei Bulatov resigned citing family circumstances, with Sergei Boyko being appointed as interim-manager the same day. On 16 September, Boyko resigned with Gagik Simonyan being placed in interim charge. On 14 October, Vadym Lazorenko was appointed as the new manager of Ararat Yerevan. On 28 December Lazorenko left Ararat Yerevan after the expiration of his contract. On 6 January, Igor Kolyvanov was announced as the new manager of Ararat Yerevan.

On 12 March 2020, the Football Federation of Armenia announced that all Armenian Premier League games had been postponed until 23 March due to the COVID-19 pandemic.

On 10 July, Lori announced that 17 of the players and staff had tested positive for COVID-19, and as a result the whole club was now isolating, as a result their lat game of the season, scheduled for 14 July against Ararat Yerevan was cancelled with the points not being awarded to either team.

Squad

Left club during season

Transfers

In

Loans in

Released

Friendlies

Competitions

Armenian Premier League

Regular season

Results summary

Results

Table

Championship round

Results summary

Results

Table

Armenian Cup

Statistics

Appearances and goals

|-
|colspan="16"|Players who left Ararat Yerevan during the season:

|}

Goal scorers

Clean sheets

Disciplinary Record

References

FC Ararat Yerevan seasons
Ararat Yerevan